The 170th Massachusetts General Court, consisting of the Massachusetts Senate and the Massachusetts House of Representatives, met in 1977 and 1978 during the governorship of Michael Dukakis. Kevin B. Harrington served as president of the Senate and Thomas W. McGee served as speaker of the House.

Senators

Representatives

See also
 95th United States Congress
 List of Massachusetts General Courts

References

Further reading

External links
 
 
 
 
 
 
  (1964-1994)

Political history of Massachusetts
Massachusetts legislative sessions
massachusetts
1977 in Massachusetts
massachusetts
1978 in Massachusetts